W. H. Allen may refer to:

People
William Henry Allen (1784–1813), American naval officer
William Howard Allen (1790–1822), American naval officer
William Henry Allen (academician) (1808–1882), American professor
William Henry Allen (engineer) (1844–1926), British engineer
William H. Allen (architect) (1858–1936), architect in New Haven, Connecticut
W. H. Allen (artist) (1863–1943), English landscape artist

Organisations
 W. H. Allen & Co., a London bookseller and publisher now owned by Penguin Random House
 W. H. Allen, Sons and Co, a British engineering company merged to become Amalgamated Power Engineering

See also
 W. H. Allen House, an historic house built in 1873 in Arkansas